Sarah Edmundson may refer to:

 Sarah Emma Edmonds (1841–1898)
 Sarah Edmondson (born 1977)